is a Japanese manga series written and illustrated by Yasunori Mitsunaga. It has been serialized in Shōnen Gahōsha's seinen manga magazine Young King Ours GH since November 2019.

Publication
Written and illustrated by Yasunori Mitsunaga, Isekai Sniper wa Onna Senshi no Mofumofu Pet started in Shōnen Gahōsha's seinen manga magazine Young King Ours GH on November 15, 2019. Shōnen Gahōsha has collected its chapters into individual tankōbon volumes. The first volume was released on May 29, 2020. As of August 30, 2022, five volumes have been released.

Volume list

See also
Princess Resurrection, another manga series by the same author
Avarth, another manga series by the same author
Time Stop Hero, another manga series by the same author

References

Fiction about reincarnation
Isekai anime and manga
Seinen manga
Shōnen Gahōsha manga